Western Region or West Region may refer to:

Places
Al Gharbia, Abu Dhabi, the Western Region
Western Region, Bahrain
Western Region, Eastern Cape, South Africa
Western Region, Ghana
Western Region (Iceland)
Western Region, Nepal
Western Region, Nigeria (former)
Western Region, Serbia
Western Region, Uganda
Western Regions, a historic name for central Asia
West Region, Cameroon
West Region, Ireland
West Region, Singapore
Western Krai of the former Russian Empire

Other
Western Region (Boy Scouts of America), one of the large geographic divisions of the Boy Scouts of America
Western Region of British Railways
Western Region Football League, an Australian rules football semi-professional league

See also
Central Region (disambiguation)
Eastern Region (disambiguation)
Northern Region (disambiguation)
Southern Region (disambiguation)

de:Western Region